Sarah Stoodley is a Canadian politician, who was elected to the Newfoundland and Labrador House of Assembly in the 2019 provincial election. She represents the electoral district of Mount Scio as a member of the Newfoundland and Labrador Liberal Party.

Prior to her election to the House of Assembly, Stoodley was an elected alumni representative on the Memorial University Board of Regents and a board member of the Pippy Park Commission.

Political career
Stoodley was elected to the House of Assembly in the 2019 election and was one of only 2 Liberals (alongside Elvis Loveless) elected for the first time.

In June 2019 she was appointed Parliamentary Secretary to the Minister of Tourism, Culture, Industry and Innovation.

In March 2020, Stoodley introduced a private member's motion to the House of Assembly calling for the expansion of PIPEDA; the motion was passed.

On August 19, 2020, Stoodley was appointed Minister of Digital Government and Service Newfoundland and Labrador, Minister Responsible for the Office of the Chief Information Officer, and Minister Responsible for Francophone Affairs in the Furey government.

She was re-elected in the 2021 provincial election.

Personal life
Stoodley grew up in Grand Falls-Windsor and has lived in England. She obtained a Bachelor of Commerce and Master of Arts both from the Memorial University of Newfoundland.

In August 2020, Stoodley announced that she was pregnant with her first child. In response to her pregnancy, the House of Assembly changed policy to allow parents to bring their babies with them into the legislative chambers.

References

Living people
Liberal Party of Newfoundland and Labrador MHAs
Women MHAs in Newfoundland and Labrador
21st-century Canadian politicians
Year of birth missing (living people)
21st-century Canadian women politicians
Women government ministers of Canada